"The Day Before Sunday" is the third television play episode of the third season of the American television series CBS Playhouse. The episode told the story of an unmarried middle-aged woman who meets a divorced man on her plane as she flies to attend her niece's graduation.

"The Day Before Sunday", broadcast in February 1970, was the final CBS Playhouse episode to air.

References

External links 
 

1969 American television episodes
1969 plays
CBS Playhouse episodes